The CANT 25 was an Italian shipboard single-seat sesquiplane flying boat fighter that entered service with the Regia Aeronautica (Italian Royal Air Force) in 1931.

Design and development
The CANT 25 was developed from the earlier CANT 18 flying boat to meet a requirement for a flying boat fighter for the Regia Aeronautica. The aircraft was of wooden construction and was armed with two fixed, forward-firing 7.7-millimeter (0.303-inch) Vickers machine guns. It was built in two versions, the CANT 25M with removable wings and the CANT 25AR which was strengthened for catapult launching and had folding wings.

The CANT 25M appeared first, in 1931. It had Warren truss-type interplane bracing and a 306-kilowatt (410-horsepower) Fiat A.20 12-cylinder water-cooled engine mounted to drive a two-bladed pusher propeller, and was used for catapult trials aboard warships of the Regia Marina (Italian Royal Navy). It was replaced by the CANT 25AR—AR stood for Ali Ripiegabili, Italian for "Folding Wings"—which instead had vertical interplane bracing struts to allow the outer panels of the wings to fold to the rear. It also had strengthened tailplane bracing and a more powerful engine, a 328-kilowatt (440-horsepower) version of the Fiat A.20.

Variants
CANT 25M
Initial version with detachable wings
CANT 25AR
Later version strengthened for catapult launching and with folding wings

Operators

Regia Aeronautica

Specifications (25AR)

See also

Notes

References

The Illustrated Encyclopedia of Aircraft (Part Work 1982–1985). Orbis Publishing: 1985.
Green, William, and Gordon Swanborough. The Complete Book of Fighters: An Illustrated Encyclopedia of Every Fighter Aircraft Built and Flown. New York: SMITHMARK Publishers, 1994. .

25
Flying boats
1920s Italian fighter aircraft
Biplanes
Single-engined pusher aircraft
Aircraft first flown in 1927